Minem Mehmudjan (born 15 January 1994) is a Chinese footballer currently playing as a defender for Xinjiang Tianshan Leopard.

Career statistics

Club
.

References

1994 births
Living people
Footballers from Xinjiang
Chinese footballers
Association football defenders
China League One players
Xinjiang Tianshan Leopard F.C. players